Purple Pebble Pictures (PPP) is an Indian film production company established by actress and producer Priyanka Chopra Jonas. It is located in Mumbai, Maharastra, India. The company aims on producing small budget films and promoting new talent such as writers, actors, directors, and technicians.

In 2016, the company produced the critically acclaimed comedy-drama Ventilator, which won several accolades including three National Film Awards. In 2019, the company's fourth Marathi film, Paani won the National Film Award for Best Film on Environment Conservation/Preservation. The same year, the company released the biographical film The Sky Is Pink which received three Filmfare Awards nominations.

History

Purple Pebble Pictures was founded by  Priyanka Chopra. The company ventured into films, television, and AD films. Chopra had always wanted to produce films but had been waiting for right time due to her immensely busy schedule. In May 2014, it was reported that she would be co-producing Madhur Bhandarkar's political drama Madamji, a film she had signed earlier that year to star in. It was confirmed in August 2014 that Chopra indeed will be producing the film. However, the film was postponed to an unknown date due to full season extension of Chopra's American television series Quantico. She said "Madamji is on hold and this film is very close to my heart. For this film, I have to give 70 days for shoot but since my show got extended, I couldn’t do it. Hopefully, someday I will make it. But right now I am not doing it."

Production ventures
The company released its first project in 2016, the mobile series It's My City, a sitcom about four girls living in an apartment owned by Priyanka Chopra. Co-produced with Endemol Shine India, it guest starred Chopra as herself (an official landlady, unofficial guardian and protective friend to the girls). The company next produced a Bhojpuri film entitled Bam Bam Bol Raha Hai Kashi, which was released in  January 2016.

The company next produced the Marathi film Ventilator, which was released on 4 November 2016. The film featured an ensemble cast of more than 100 actors from Marathi cinema and theatre background including Ashutosh Gowariker, and Jitendra Joshi. Written and directed by Rajesh Mapuskar, the film tells the story of a joint family whose eldest and the most respected member is hospitalised before the Ganesh Chaturthi festival. The film received critical acclaim and performed well at the box office. The film received several awards and nominations, including three awards at the 64th National Film Awards: Best Director for Mapuskar, Best Editing and Best Sound Mixing. Ventilator also received 16 nominations at the 2017 Filmfare Marathi Awards, including Best Film and won five awards.

The Punjabi film Sarvann starring Amrinder Gill was released in January 2017. The company next released the Marathi Kay Re Rascalaa in July 2018. Another Bhojpuri film, Kaashi Amarnath was released in October 2018. The Sikkimese film Pahuna: The Little Visitors directed by Pakhi Tyrewala which premiered at the 2017 Toronto International Film Festival, was released in December 2018. The film won a Special Mention in The International Feature Film Category at SCHLINGEL International Children's Film Festival in Germany.

In February 2019, the drama film Firebrand , directed by Aruna Raje, starring Usha Jadhav, Rajeshwari Sachdev, Girish Kulkarni and Sachin Khedekar was released on Netflix. The Assamese film Bhoga Khirikee, directed by Jahnu Barua and starring Zerifa Wahid, Seema Biswas, Sanjay Kharghoria, Kashvi Sharma and Mohammad Ali Shah in the principal roles premiered at the 2018 Guwahati International Film Festival and is scheduled to be released in 2019. Bhoga Khirikee received three nominations, Best Indie Film, Best Director and Best Actress for Wahid, at the 2019 Indian Film Festival of Melbourne.

The company's another 2019 film Paani, based on a true story exploring the water crisis issue in Maharashtra and directed by debut director Adinath Kothare went on to win the National Film Award for Best Film on Environment Conservation/Preservation. at the 66th National Film Awards. This was followed by the biographical film The Sky Is Pink, a co-production with RSVP Movies and Roy Kapur Films, later that year. Directed by Shonali Bose, the film tells the story of Aisha Chaudhary's parents, who are dealing with their daughter's illness (pulmonary fibrosis). The film received generally positive reviews. The film received three Filmfare Awards nominations: Best Film (Critics), Best Actress for Chopra and Best Supporting Actress for Wasim.

Upcoming projects
Purple Pebble Pictures has several projects at the various stages of production. The company is producing two Bengali films Brishtir Oppekhyayy and Bus Stop E Keu Nei. In addition, a Bengali-Marathi bilingual film, Nalini, which is based on the romance between Rabindranath Tagore and Atmaram Pandurang's daughter Annapurna is also under production. The company is also producing two Children's films the Konkani film Little Joe, Kaha Ho? and their first Hindi film Almaseer both of which will be directed by female directors. Chopra has also signed Aniruddha Roy Chowdhury to direct a Hindi film, which she will be headlining.

In July 2017, the company announced their plans to venture into producing small budget Hollywood films as well, with a project on racism under development. The company will also be co-producing the Malayalam remake of Ventilator after receiving several offers to remake the film in other languages. A Children's film based on stray dogs is also under works.

Films

Television

References

External links
 Official website

Hindi cinema
Film production companies based in Mumbai
Entertainment companies established in 2015
2015 establishments in Maharashtra
Producers who won the Best Film on Environment Conservation/Preservation National Film Award